Cochin Tirumala Devaswom, also called Gosripuram is the biggest and most important socio-religious institution of Gowda Saraswat Brahmins of Kerala, India. The temple is situated at Cherlai in the heart of Mattancherry town in Cochin area which is one of the earliest settlements of GSBs in Kerala. The temple was established in the later half of the 16th century. The history of GSBs in Kerala is inter-woven with that of this temple and its Venkateswara idol.

Devatha & Upadevatha 

The main idol of Venkateswara, his consorts, Sreedevi and Bhoodevi on his either sides and he is placed on the top of the Simhasan. Utsav Murti with consorts in the middle step, Utsav Lakshmi at the lower step and Saligrama are on the lowest step.

There are four sub-temple or shrines inside the temple premises, there are temples dedicated to Goddess Mahalakshmi, Hanuman, Garuda and Vigneshwara. Vrindavan of Shri Sukrathindra Thirtha Swamiji (samadhi 1949 A.D, 19th Madathipathi of Kashi Math) is located here. A Naga Yakshi pedestal is situated on the southwest corner of the main temple next to the Vighneswara Temple.

Outside the temple yard, there are statues of the Vijayanagara king Saluva Narasimha Deva Raya and Swami Vijayendra Theertha of Kumbhakona Math, as well as a temple tank Outside the temple. A notable feature of the temple is its huge bronze bell, about four feet in diameter and six feet in height. In earlier centuries, the chiming of the bell could be heard even in areas far from the temple.

Besides these upakovils, There are other temples working under Cochin Thirumala devaswom (CTD). they are - 
 Manja bhagavati temple, also known as Sindhura bhagavati temple in the same locality dedicated to goddess Mahishasura Mardhini. This temple is popularly called 'Uppu' bhagavati temple as the devotees offer salt (uppu (ഉപ്പ്) in Malayalam) in front of this temple. It is believed that, by offering salt and pepper, any severe diseases affected to anyone recovers soon. 
 Udyaneshwar Temple, dedicated to lord Siva located at the North east corner of CTD.
 Navagraha Temple, located at the North east corner of CTD.
 Kuladevatha Makalakshmi Temple, located at the North west corner of CTD.
 Sri Venkatachalapathi Temple, Karnakodam, located at the heart of Ernakulam district, near International Stadium, Kochi.

History 

The presiding deity here is Venkatachalapathy. In 1568, with the fall of the Vijayanagara Empire and coercive conversions to Christianity by the Portuguese, the Gowda Saraswatha Brahmins migrated from Goa to Kochi. During their migration, Swami Vijayendra Teertha of Kumbhakona Math brought the idol of Venkatachalapathy to Kochi. The majority of households living around the temple belong to the GSB community.

In 1599, a temple, which was to be plundered many times, was built to house the idol. The Portuguese destroyed the temple in 1662, but it was reconstructed, in 1663, during the Dutch reign. In 1719, the idol disappeared mysteriously and was later found on a beach. It was kept at the Dutch Governor's residence for a while and then restored to the temple.

In 1791, when the temple was plundered again, the idol was kept in Alappuzha for many years. In 1853, it was brought back to the temple.

Gowda Saraswata Brahmins (Locally known as Konkanies) since their forefathers came and settled down in cochin during 1560 A.D from Goa, In fear of the mass conversion policy brought up by Portuguese there.

The Story of the Vigraha or the Idol 

The Vighraha or idol of Lord Venkateshwara was installed in the Cochin Temple according to legend originally belonged to the Vijayanagara ruler named Saluva Narasimha Deva Raya who had usurped throne in 1472 A.D. He was a great devotee of Lord Venkateshwara of Tirumala Hills, and frequently visited Tirupati for his worship. But when he was physically incapable of visiting him, he wished to see him daily .One night a vision appeared before the king in his dream and told him that he need not take the trouble of visiting him, and that the lord himself would come to his capital city. The King was further told that a sculpture would call on him for casting an Image, that the King should provide it with all the materials necessary and that the image he would make would be the same of the Lord of Tirumalla Hills.The King was Highly Pleased.

True to the dream, a sculpture appeared before the king and after getting materials required for making the image, went himself into a room and shut himself up. As the sculpture did not come out even after a long time, the king had room broken open. He was amazed to see a resplendent image of the lord of the seven hills, The king guessed that it was none other Lord Viswakarma himself. Thus the idol came to be known as "Swayamboo" meaning self-born.

Soon after, King built a temple for the installation of the Idol. Before the Prathista the Lord again appeared before the King in his dream another night and gave him instruction that the prathista should take place when a signal is given by the beating of Dundubhi (Drum). But As fate would have it, just at the time of the signal expected to be heard, few crows flew over the Dundhubhi with twigs and the twigs was accidentally dropped on the Dundhubhi making a sound which was mistaken for the signal given by the lord, and the installation took place, which was found to be inauspicious time, only when the king heard the real drum beat later and realized his mistake. The Disappointed King retired to bed, but he lord came to pacify him in his dream. The Lord Said that he would always remain with him till his death. The Lord Also Added that because of the inauspicious time of his installation, he would leave the city and go to Gosripuram (Later this name became Cochin).

First Prathishta at Cochin 

Swami Vijayeendra Thirtha of Kumbakonam Math while on tour of visiting pilgrim centers halted near the neglected well where the Venkateshwara idol was lying. At the time of Conclusion of "Sandhyaa Vandana" by the Swamiji, A serpent with raised hood appeared in front of the swamiji showing the sign to follow the serpent. Swamiji Followed the Serpent. After crawling a small distance they reached the neglected well and from where the serpent went down and disappeared. Swamiji looked at the bottom of the neglected well and found the Venkateshwara Idol lying there. Swamiji took it to the place where he was performing his Sandhya Vandana and performed few poojas to the venkateshwara idol, then swamiji continued his journey and reached a small village and halted there, The Lord in Swamiji's Dream told to direct to Goshripura( Cochin), where the Lord wished that his idol should be installed there permanently.

According to his dreams Swamiji went to Goshripura where he was received by Mala Pai, the leader of the Cochin Mahajanams. Mala Pai expressed his desire to Swamiji that the Idol of Shree Venkateshwara should be handed over to him for the worship of the deity here at Goshripuram for the Mahajanams.

Swamiji wanted to give the deity Abhishekam (bath) in gold coins. Mala Pai who was very rich, told that he would fulfill swamiji's wish for the abhishekam with gold coins himself alone. But the Abhishekam could not be completed because of the top portion of the crown still remained unfilled. On consulting Astrologers it was said that it was revealed by the lord that the gold coins for his abhishekam should be given by the contribution of 360 families residing at cochin. Mala Pai went all over the houses of the Brahmins living in cochin and humbly requested to contribute his mite. After a long contribution the lord was not yet fully filled with gold coins. This was because of the Brahmin who was old and had no good clothes to wear to visit the temple were the festival was going on was not able to contribute. Mala Pai went to his house requested for the contribution, even being poor he gave a "Fanam", a small coin which was his sole earning to Mala Pai. Swamiji kept his Fanam on the top of the Vighraha, The Vighraha was Immediately filled with Gold Coins. On enquiry astrologer in his predictions said that the lord was highly pleased with the devotion of the poor Brahmin who gave his sole earning to lord. Lord said that he is for him. The Poor Old Man Was Named as "Daridra Narayan". Later a Temple was constructed for the lord and Swami Sudhindra Thirtha of Kumbakonam Math (Successor of Vijayendra Thirtha) performed the First Prathista of Lord Venkateshwara at Cochin in the Year 1599 A.D. in the Lunar month of Chaithra on Pournami Day when the moon was moon was in conjunction with Chitra Star. To Commemorate the First Prathista, an 8-day festival called Aarat (Utsav) was introduced

Destruction of the temple and its Second Prathishta 

The temple was destroyed on 2 March 1662 by the Portuguese. The Houses of Konkanies were plundered and markets were looted and the community fled with the Vighraha of Venkateshwara to Udayaperur nearby Tripunithara for safety. They remained there for nearly 10 months. While they were at Udayaperur where they stayed as refugees without proper shelter they took a pledge to spread their habitation in sixteen places eight in Cohin Kingdom and Eight in Travancore Kingdom thereby building sixteen Tirumala Devaswoms and calling each place as "Gramam". Thus there are sixteen grama or Tirumala Devaswoms that exist. The Dutch who came to Cochin Defeated the Portuguese in a war on 6 January 1663 and established Fort premises of Cohin in their rule. The community came back to Cochin with the image and Re-established their settlement in Cochin with the help of the Dutch. A new temple for the Lord was constructed their and the Second Prathista was performed by H.H. Swami Devendra Thirtha of Sri. Kashi Math along with his Shishya H.H. Swami Madhavendra Thirtha in the year 1719 A.D.

Fight with The Raja and its Third Prathishta 

The year 1791 was marked by the terrible persecution of the Konkanis at the hands of Raja Rama Varma IX (Sakthan Thampuran). The ruler of Cochin massacred a large number of Konkani merchants, including Dewaresa Kini, on 12 October 1791. The Raja ordered the execution of three of the guardians of the Thirumala Devaswom Temple because they refused to yield any part of the treasures belonging to the shrine. Sakthan Thampuran then plundered the shops around the temple, carting off the property of the Konkani merchants, before proceeding to loot the temple. The plunder was calculated at over 1.6 lakh from the temple alone.

The persecuted Konkanis then fled southward to Thuravoor and Alappuzha (Alleppey) in the Kingdom of Thiruvithamkoor (Travancore), with the murti of Sri Venkateshwara. At Alleppey, having been assured protection by the Dharma Raja,  they built a temple on the banks of the Alleppey canal. Sakthan Thampuran, and then his successors, made vain efforts to bring the deity back to Cochin but were repulsed by the Maharajas of Travancore who had come to believe that their kingdom prospered because of the presence of the murti and of the Konkani merchants. In 1853, when Kerala Varma IV  reigned in Cochin, the Konkani community finally agreed to return, and brought back the murti on 7 February 1853.

The third pratishtha of the Vigraha of Sri Venkateshwara in the present resanctified temple was performed in 1881 by Swami Bhuvanendra Thirtha along with his shishya and designated successor Swami Varadendra Thirtha.

References

Official Website of Cochin Thirumala Devaswom

External links
 Kerala Tourism
 tdtemple.org
 http://gsbkonkanis.coffeecup.com/html5/Kochi.html

Hindu temples in Kochi
Mattancherry